La Côte-de-Beaupré is a regional county municipality in the Capitale-Nationale region of Quebec, Canada. The seat is Château-Richer. Its most populous community is the municipality of Boischatel.

Subdivisions
There are 11 subdivisions within the RCM:

Cities & Towns (3)
Beaupré
Château-Richer
Sainte-Anne-de-Beaupré

Municipalities (4)
Boischatel
L'Ange-Gardien
Saint-Ferréol-les-Neiges
Saint-Tite-des-Caps

Parishes (2)
Saint-Joachim
Saint-Louis-de-Gonzague-du-Cap-Tourmente

Unorganized Territory (2)
Lac-Jacques-Cartier
Sault-au-Cochon

Transportation

Access Routes
Highways and numbered routes that run through the municipality, including external routes that start or finish at the county border:

 Autoroutes
 None

 Principal Highways
 
 

 Secondary Highways
 

 External Routes
 None

See also
 List of regional county municipalities and equivalent territories in Quebec

References

 La Côte-de-Beaupré Regional County Municipality Statistics Canada